Katarina Strožová (born 13 February 1986) is a Slovak footballer who plays as a forward for Czech club 1. FC Slovácko. She has been a member of the Slovakia women's national team.

International career
Strožová capped for Slovakia at senior level during the 2011 FIFA Women's World Cup qualification – UEFA Group 2, in a 0–2 away loss to Belarus on 25 August 2010.

References

1986 births
Living people
Women's association football forwards
Slovak women's footballers
Sportspeople from Skalica
Slovakia women's international footballers
1. FC Slovácko (women) players
Slovak expatriate footballers
Slovak expatriate sportspeople in the Czech Republic
Expatriate women's footballers in the Czech Republic
Czech Women's First League players